Gathuthi is a settlement in Nyeri County, Kenya.

Climate 
The climate of Central Province is generally cooler than that of the rest of Kenya, due to the region's higher altitude. Rainfall is fairly reliable, falling in two seasons, one from early March to May (the long rains) and a second during October and November (the short rains).

See also 
 Ruiru
 Gichuru

References 

Populated places in Central Province (Kenya)
Nyeri County